The Scottish Meteorological Society was founded in 1855 by David Milne-Home with private funding, particularly from wealthy landowners who wished to compile meteorological records in order to improve agriculture.

The Society founded the observatory on Ben Nevis, officially opened in 1883.

In 1921, the Society amalgamated with the Royal Meteorological Society.

Publications
 Journal of the Scottish Meteorological Society, Volume 1 (1864) - Volume 18 (1917/19)

Notable members
 W S Bruce
 Alexander Buchan, credited with establishing the weather map as the basis of weather forecasting 
 David Milne-Home, chairman of the Council of the Society
 Cargill Gilston Knott, President of the Society
 John Murray, oceanographer
 Robert Traill Omond, first Superintendent of the Ben Nevis observatory
 Dr James Stark, first Secretary of the Society
 Thomas Stevenson, co-founder and secretary
 Charles Thomson Rees Wilson
 Clement Lindley Wragge, awarded the Society's Gold Medal

References

Professional associations based in Scotland
Organizations established in 1855
Learned societies of Scotland
Climate of Scotland
Meteorological societies
Geographic societies
Climatological research organizations
19th century in Scotland
1921 in Scotland
History of agriculture in Scotland
1855 establishments in Scotland
Defunct organisations based in Scotland
History of science and technology in Scotland
1921 disestablishments in Scotland